The kilometre per hour (SI symbol: km/h; non-standard abbreviations: kph, km/hr) is a unit of speed, expressing the number of kilometres travelled in one hour.

History
Although the metre was formally defined in 1799, the term "kilometres per hour" did not come into immediate use – the myriametre and myriametre per hour were preferred to kilometres and kilometres per hour. In 1802 the term "myriamètres par heure" appeared in French literature. The Dutch on the other hand adopted the kilometre in 1817 but gave it the local name of the mijl (Dutch mile).

Notation history
The SI representations, classified as symbols, are "km/h", "" and "". Several other abbreviations of "kilometres per hour" have been used since the term was introduced and many are still in use today; for example, dictionaries list "kph", "kmph" and "km/hr" as English abbreviations. While these forms remain widely used, they are explicitly disallowed by the International Bureau of Weights and Measures for use with the International System of Units.

Abbreviations
Abbreviations for "kilometres per hour" did not appear in the English language until the late nineteenth century.

The kilometre, a unit of length, first appeared in English in 1810, and the compound unit of speed "kilometers per hour" was in use in the US by 1866. "Kilometres per hour" did not begin to be abbreviated in print until many years later, with several different abbreviations existing near-contemporaneously.

With no central authority to dictate the rules for abbreviations (other than the official km/h symbol dictated by the International Bureau of Weights and Measures), various publishing houses have their own rules that dictate whether to use upper-case letters, lower-case letters, periods and so on, reflecting both changes in fashion and the image of the publishing house concerned. For example, news organisations such as Reuters and The Economist
require "kph".

In informal Australian usage, km/h is more commonly pronounced "kays"  or "kays an hour". In military usage, "klicks" is used, though written as km/h.

Unit symbols
In 1879, four years after the signing of the Treaty of the Metre, the International Committee for Weights and Measures (CIPM) proposed a range of symbols for the various metric units then under the auspices of the General Conference on Weights and Measures (CGPM). Among these were the use of the symbol "km" for "kilometre".

In 1948, as part of its preparatory work for the SI, the CGPM adopted symbols for many units of measure that did not have universally agreed symbols, one of which was the symbol "h" for "hours". The SI standards, which were MKS-based rather than CGS-based were published in 1960 and have since then have been adopted by many authorities around the globe including academic publishers and legal authorities.

The SI explicitly states that unit symbols are not abbreviations and are to be written using a very specific set of rules. M. Danloux-Dumesnils provides the following justification for this distinction:

SI is also the preferred system of measure in academia and in education.

Alternative abbreviations in official use
 km/j or km/jam (Indonesia and Malaysia)
 km/t or km/tim (Norway, Denmark and Sweden; also use km/h)
 kmph (Sri Lanka and India)
 กม./ชม. (Thailand; also uses km/hr)
 كم/س or كم/ساعة (Arabic-speaking countries, also use km/h)
קמ"ש (Israel)

Regulatory use 

During the early years of the motor car, each country developed its own system of road signs. In 1968 the Vienna Convention on Road Signs and Signals was drawn up under the auspices of the United Nations Economic and Social Council to harmonise road signs across the world. Many countries have since signed the convention and adopted its proposals. Speed limits signs that are either directly authorised by the convention or have been influenced by the convention are shown below:

In 1972 the EU published a directive (overhauled in 1979 to take British and Irish interests into account) that required member states to abandon CGS-based units in favour of SI. The use of SI implicitly required that member states use "km/h" as the shorthand for "kilometres per hour" on official documents.

Another EU directive, published in 1975, regulates the layout of speedometers within the European Union, and requires the text "km/h" in all languages, even where that is not the natural abbreviation for the local version of "kilometres per hour". Examples include:
 Dutch: "" ("hour" is "" – does not start with "h"),
 Portuguese: "" ("kilometre" is "" – does not start with "k")
 Greek: "" (a different script).

In 1988 the United States National Highway Traffic Safety Administration promulgated a rule stating that "MPH and/or km/h" were to be used in speedometer displays. On May 15, 2000 this was clarified to read "MPH, or MPH and km/h". However, the Federal Motor Vehicle Safety Standard number 101 ("Controls and Displays") allows "any combination of upper- and lowercase letters" to represent the units.

Conversions
  ≡ , the SI unit of speed, metre per second
  ≈ 
  ≈  ≈ 
  ≡  (exactly)
  ≡

See also 
 Orders of magnitude (speed)
 Speed limits in the United Kingdom
 Speed limits in Canada

Notes

References

Units of velocity
Non-SI metric units